Where the Sky Meets the Land is a 2000 documentary film written and produced by Frank Müller.  The film features Kyrgyzstan, the home of poet Tschingis Aitmatov and his characters, encounters with nomads, Kyrgyz traditions and the impressive scenery.

Awards

1999
Pare Lorentz Award (International Documentary Association) - Won
IDA Award for Feature Documentary - Nominated
2000
Golden Spire Award for Film & Video - Society & Culture International (San Francisco International Film Festival) - Won

External links

2000 films
Films set in Kyrgyzstan
German documentary films
English-language German films
English-language Kyrgyzstani films
Kyrgyz-language films
2000 documentary films
Kyrgyzstani documentary films
2000s German films